Lamar Jackson (born April 13, 1998) is an American football cornerback for the Denver Broncos of the National Football League (NFL). He played college football at Nebraska and was signed as an undrafted free agent by the New York Jets in 2020.

High school career 
Jackson played quarterback, cornerback, and safety at Franklin High School.  Jackson played in the 2015 Under Armour All-American game following his senior season. Jackson committed to Nebraska on February 3, 2016, turning down offers from California, UCLA, Utah, and Washington State.

College career 
After recording forty tackles and three interceptions in his senior season, Jackson was named Nebraska's Defensive MVP and a Second-team All-Big Ten player.

College statistics

Professional career
Jackson was one of four Nebraska players that were invited to the NFL Scouting Combine. After attending the scouting combine he was described as a "matchup-specific depth player that will need to excel on special teams" via thedraftnetwork.com.

New York Jets
In the 2020 NFL Draft, Jackson went undrafted but signed with the New York Jets on May 6, 2020. He was waived on September 5, 2020, and signed to the practice squad the next day. He was elevated to the active roster on October 1 and October 10 for the team's weeks 4 and 5 games against the Denver Broncos and Arizona Cardinals, and reverted to the practice squad after each game. He was promoted to the active roster on October 13, 2020.

On August 31, 2021, Jackson was waived by the Jets and re-signed to the practice squad the next day.

Chicago Bears
On January 19, 2022, Jackson signed a reserve/future contract with the Chicago Bears. He made the Bears final roster, playing in five games before being waived on November 27, 2022.

Denver Broncos
On November 29, 2022, Jackson signed with the practice squad of the Denver Broncos. He was promoted to the active roster on December 31.

Personal life 
Lamar is the son of Catherine Horton. Jackson had a son in March 2019.

References

External links
 Chicago Bears bio
New York Jets bio
 Nebraska Cornhuskers bio

1998 births
Living people
African-American players of American football
American football cornerbacks
Chicago Bears players
Denver Broncos players
Nebraska Cornhuskers football players
New York Jets players
Players of American football from California
Sportspeople from Elk Grove, California